Yeonil No clan was one of the Korean clans. Their Bon-gwan was in Pohang, North Gyeongsang Province. Their founder was  who was dispatched to Silla when he was a Hanlin Academy in Tang dynasty. He was a son of No Jeung. No Jeung was son of ). No Jeung was appointed as Prince of Yeonil because he made an achievement during Silla period. Then,  who was a No Jeung’s son began Yeonil No clan.

See also 
 Korean clan names of foreign origin

References

External links 
 

Korean clan names of Chinese origin